George Graham (born 30 November 1944), nicknamed "Stroller", is a Scottish former football player and manager.

In his successful playing career, he made 455 appearances in England's Football League as a midfielder or forward for Aston Villa, Chelsea, Arsenal, Manchester United, Portsmouth and Crystal Palace. Approximately half of his total appearances were for Arsenal, and he was part of the side that won the Football League Championship and FA Cup "double" in 1971. Graham also made 17 appearances for California Surf in the NASL in 1978.

He then moved to the coaching staff at Crystal Palace, before joining former Palace manager Terry Venables as a coach at Queens Park Rangers. As a manager, he won numerous honours with Arsenal between 1987 and 1995, including two league titles (in 1989 and 1991), the 1993 FA Cup, two Football League Cups (in 1987 and 1993), as well as the 1994 European Cup Winners' Cup and also managed Millwall, Leeds United and Tottenham Hotspur.

He was one of the most successful managers in Arsenal's history, remaining in charge for almost a decade until he was sacked by the club's board after being found guilty by the Football Association of taking money from transfers; Graham was banned despite paying back the money, which he always claimed was an "unsolicited gift".

Early life
The youngest of seven children, Graham was born at Dykehead Road, Bargeddie, near Coatbridge on 30 November 1944. He grew up in poverty and was raised by his mother, Janet (26 April 1908 – 27 March 1977), after his father, Robert Young Graham (born 22 June 1900), died of tuberculosis and heart failure on Christmas Day 1944, when George was not yet a month old. His elder sister also died of tuberculosis on 22 February 1950.

When growing up, Graham showed considerable promise as a footballer, and Newcastle United, Chelsea and Aston Villa displayed an interest in signing him.

Playing career

Aston Villa
Graham received offers from Aston Villa, Chelsea and Newcastle United aged 15, in 1959, and visited all three clubs to see their facilities. He chose Aston Villa mainly as he and his family liked manager Joe Mercer, initially playing for their youth side, he signed professionally in 1961, on his 17th birthday. He spent five seasons at the Birmingham club, but only made ten appearances – though one of them was the club's 1963 League Cup final loss to Birmingham City.

Chelsea
Chelsea signed Graham in July 1964 for £5,000. He scored 35 goals in 72 league games for the club and won a League Cup medal in 1965 but he, along with several other Chelsea players, increasingly clashed with their volatile manager Tommy Docherty. This culminated in Graham and seven others being sent home and disciplined by Docherty for breaking a pre-match curfew in 1965.

Arsenal
Bertie Mee's Arsenal were looking for a replacement for Joe Baker, and paid £50,000 plus Tommy Baldwin in 1966 to bring Graham to Highbury. He made his debut on 1 October 1966 at home to Leicester City, and although the result was a 4–2 defeat he immediately became a regular in the Arsenal side. He was Arsenal's top scorer in both 1966–67 and 1967–68, having started out as a centre forward for the club, but later moved back into midfield as an inside forward with John Radford moving from the wing to central striker.

With Arsenal, Graham was a runner-up in both the 1968 and 1969 League Cup finals, before finally winning a medal with the 1969–70 Inter-Cities Fairs Cup. He followed it up with being an integral part of Arsenal's Double-winning side of 1970–71, and even had a claim to scoring Arsenal's equaliser in the FA Cup Final against Liverpool, although Eddie Kelly is officially credited with the goal.

Winning the Double brought the attention of Scotland and Graham was selected for the national side for the first time against Portugal on 13 October 1971. He would go on to win twelve caps over the next two years for Scotland, scoring three goals, his final one coming against Brazil on 30 June 1973. By then, however, Graham was no longer an Arsenal player. The arrival of Alan Ball midway through 1971–72 had made his place in the Arsenal side less assured. In total, he played 308 matches for Arsenal, scoring 77 goals.

Manchester United
Graham moved for £120,000 to Manchester United in December 1972, where he was soon reunited with Docherty. He spent two years at United and was relegated to Division Two in 1974. He was sold to Portsmouth during the 1974–75 season.

Portsmouth, Crystal Palace and California Surf
Graham saw out his career in England at Portsmouth and Crystal Palace. He played the summer of 1978 in America for the California Surf.

Managerial career

Millwall
After retiring from playing in 1978, Graham became the youth team coach at Crystal Palace and then from October 1980 Queens Park Rangers. On 6 December 1982, he was appointed manager of Millwall, who were then bottom of the old Third Division. Graham turned the side around in a short period of time—they avoided relegation that season on the final match of the season with a 1–0 win at Chesterfield. The following season they finished 9th and in 1984–85 they were promoted to the old Second Division. After Graham left the club in 1986, they went on to win the Second Division and win promotion to the First in 1987–88.

Arsenal
Graham's achievements at Millwall attracted attention from First Division clubs, and with the resignation of Don Howe as Arsenal manager in March 1986, their directors first offered the job to FC Barcelona coach Terry Venables, but he rejected their offer and Arsenal switched their attention to Alex Ferguson, the Aberdeen manager, as their new manager with Graham as his assistant. However, Ferguson (then in temporary charge of the Scotland national football team following the death of Jock Stein the previous September, and still in charge of Aberdeen) had decided to wait until after the World Cup that summer before deciding on his future. Graham himself never even applied for the Arsenal position but on 12 May 1986 his chairman at Millwall told him that Arsenal wanted to speak to him about the manager's job. After an interview with Peter Hill-Wood, David Dein and Ken Friar the Arsenal directors appointed Graham as their new manager on 14 May 1986. A month after arriving at Highbury, Graham was himself linked with the Scotland national team, possibly combining it with the Arsenal manager's job, but that role went to Andy Roxburgh instead.

Arsenal had not won a trophy since the FA Cup in 1978–79, and were drifting away from the top teams in the League, having not finished in the top five during any of the previous four seasons, during which the major honours were picked up by an all-conquering Liverpool as well as the likes of Manchester United and Everton.

Graham quickly discarded the likes of Paul Mariner, Tony Woodcock, Stewart Robson and Tommy Caton, and replaced them with new signings and youth team products. He also imposed much stricter discipline than his predecessors, both in the dressing room and on the pitch. Arsenal's form immediately improved, so much so that the club were top of the League at Christmas 1986, the club's centenary, for the first time in a decade. The key players in the upturn were young defender Tony Adams and high-scoring winger Martin Hayes.

Arsenal finished fourth in Graham's first season in charge, and they went on to win the 1987 League Cup, beating Liverpool 2–1. While Arsenal lost the League Cup final the following year (a shock 3–2 defeat to Luton Town), they remained consistent in the league. Graham's side featured tight defensive discipline, embodied by his young captain Tony Adams, who along with Lee Dixon, Steve Bould and Nigel Winterburn, would form the basis of the club's defence for over a decade. However, contrary to popular belief, during this time Arsenal were not a purely defensive side; Graham also built up an impressive midfield containing David Rocastle, Michael Thomas and Paul Merson, and striker Alan Smith, whose prolific goal-scoring regularly brought him more than 20 goals per season.

At the end of Graham's third season (1988–89), the club won their first League title since 1971 (when Graham had been an Arsenal player), in highly dramatic fashion, in the final game of the season against holders and league leaders Liverpool at Anfield. Arsenal needed to win by two goals to take the title; Alan Smith scored early in the second half to make it 1–0, but as time ticked by Arsenal struggled to get a second, and with the 90 minutes elapsed on the clock, they still needed another goal. With only seconds to go, a Smith flick-on found Michael Thomas surging through the Liverpool defence; the young midfielder calmly lifted the ball over Bruce Grobbelaar and into the net, and Arsenal were League Champions. However, there was no chance to enter the European Cup just yet for Graham's team, as the ban on English clubs in European competitions (which was imposed by UEFA in 1985 following the Heysel disaster) continued for another season.

After finishing fourth in 1989–90, Graham signed goalkeeper David Seaman and Swedish winger Anders Limpar in the close season; both players proved vital as Arsenal won a second title in 1990–91 and reached the FA Cup semi-finals, losing to arch-rivals Tottenham Hotspur. They lost just one league game all season - their 24th match of the league campaign against Chelsea on 2 February.

Arsenal finished ahead of runners-up Liverpool in the race for the league title that season; in February 1991 the Liverpool manager Kenny Dalglish had suddenly announced his resignation as manager, and Graham's name was among those mentioned by the media as a possible successor to Dalglish. However, Graham was quick to rule himself out of the running, and the job instead went to another Scot, Graeme Souness.

In the autumn of 1991, Graham went on to sign a striker who would break the club's all-time top scoring records, Ian Wright from Crystal Palace, and led the club into their first entry in the European Cup for twenty years. However, the continental adventure was short-lived: Arsenal were knocked out by S.L. Benfica in the second round and failed to make the lucrative final stages. 1991–92 brought more disappointment when the Gunners were knocked out of the FA Cup in the third round by lowly Wrexham, though Arsenal did reasonably well in the league, finishing fourth.

After this season, Graham changed his tactics; he became more defensive and turned out far less attack-minded sides, which depended mainly on goals from Wright rather than the whole team. Between 1986–87 and 1991–92, Arsenal averaged 66 League goals a season (scoring 81 in 1991–92), but between 1992–93 and 1994–95 only averaged 48; this included just 40 in 1992–93, when the club finished 10th in the inaugural season of the FA Premier League, scoring fewer than any other team in the division.

Graham's Arsenal became cup specialists, and in 1992–93 they became the first side to win the FA Cup and League Cup double, both times beating Sheffield Wednesday, 2–1 in the League Cup Final and 2–1 in the FA Cup Final replay. The next season they continued in the same vein, winning the UEFA Cup Winners' Cup, their second European trophy; in the final Arsenal beat favourites and holders Parma 1–0 with a tight defensive performance and Alan Smith's 21st-minute goal from a left foot volley.

The 1994 Cup Winners' Cup proved to be Graham's last trophy at the club. It was on 21 February 1995 that Graham, who had led Arsenal to six trophies in eight seasons, lost his job after a Premier League inquiry found he had accepted an illegal £425,000 payment from Norwegian agent Rune Hauge following Arsenal's 1992 acquisition of John Jensen and Pål Lydersen, two of Hauge's clients. Graham was eventually banned for a year by the Football Association for his involvement in the scandal, after he admitted he had received an "unsolicited gift" from Hauge. At the time, Arsenal were struggling a little in the league, had lost a League Cup quarter final to Liverpool, been dumped out of the FA Cup after a third round replay by Millwall, and (as Cup Winners' Cup holders) had also lost the Super Cup to AC Milan. But of course all that had no bearing on Graham’s sacking, which was more down to brown envelopes of money, as the word "bung" embedded itself in the football lexicon. 

His departure from Arsenal marked the closing of a chapter in which the Gunners had made a name for themselves as a team of spoilers, admired for their stolid adherence to a compact strategy. Within 18 months, the club had appointed Arsène Wenger, ushering in a new age of football.

Leeds United
After serving his ban, Graham's return to football management came with Leeds United in September 1996. After the fifth game of the season he replaced the long serving Howard Wilkinson. Graham was swiftly appointed but found himself unable to make an immediate impact, leading Leeds to five losses from his first six in the league and another defeat to Aston Villa in the League Cup. 

Going into November, Leeds hovered just above the relegation zone and no side in the division had conceded more goals. Graham’s miserable start to the job was compounded with a 3–0 defeat away to Arsenal, one of Arsène Wenger’s first games in charge. But soon enough, the Scottish coach’s methods started to bear fruit in a brutally efficient fashion. 

By the turn of the year, Leeds were unmistakably a George Graham team – risk-averse to the point of parody, yet unarguably solid as a rock. Before Christmas, they went a club-record five games without conceding, with goalless draws in successive outings against Middlesbrough, Tottenham and Everton. Packing the defence with as many bodies as possible, with Lucas Radebe becoming a top-class operator and Nigel Martyn offering a strong argument to be England's No. 1. Leeds had become a defensive powerhouse. It was The Graham Way: at least eight of Leeds' 11 men were focused first and foremost on nullifying the opposition. It invariably worked. They ended the season with 20 clean sheets – a club record for a 38-game season that’s unlikely to be broken. In the end, Leeds scored just 28 goals. Not only did they stay up, but they somehow finished 11th. 

Where Leeds scored 28 goals in the 1996–97 season, they notched 57 in the 1997–98 season. That one season would prove useful in laying solid organisational foundations for the years to come. Jimmy Floyd Hasselbaink was signed in the summer of 1997, scoring 16 Premier League goals, and 22 in all competitions, as Leeds finished 5th during Graham’s one full season in charge, while the club continued their ascent under his former assistant and successor David O'Leary. Graham left Leeds in acrimonious circumstances, returning to London to take over at Tottenham on 1st October 1998. 

The move came at Leeds' hotel on the island of Madeira following Leeds UEFA Cup first round penalty shootout victory over Portuguese League side Maritimo 29 September 1998. Spurs' Alan Sugar telephoned Leeds chairman Peter Ridsdale, who admitted that after a brief telephone conversation a deal was done, with compensation agreed which would allow Graham to fulfil his wish of returning to London. Graham made no secret of his desire to head back to the capital following Leeds' 3–3 draw with Tottenham in North London on 26 September 1998. He cited family and personal reasons.

Tottenham Hotspur
Just five months after taking charge of Tottenham Hotspur, he guided the club to victory over Leicester City in the 1999 League Cup Final, and with it a place in the 1999–2000 UEFA Cup. Despite guiding the club to its first trophy in eight seasons, Graham could not achieve a finish higher than tenth in the Premier League.

Tottenham reached the last four of the 2000–01 FA Cup with a 3–2 victory over West Ham United 11 March 2001 and Graham was looking forward to pitting his wits against his former club Arsenal in the semi-finals. He was sacked on 16 March 2001, soon after the club had been purchased by ENIC, for alleged breach of contract. The club stated that Graham had been issued "several written warnings prior to his sacking for giving out what was deemed by the club as being private information" before, earlier that week, apparently informing the media he had "a limited budget" for new players and expressing his disappointment with it. This led to his being summoned to a meeting with Spurs executive vice-chairman David Buchler, after which he was dismissed. Buchler subsequently questioned whether Graham had the interests of the club at heart and described his conduct in the meeting as "aggressive and defiant". Graham's legal representatives issued a statement expressing he was "shocked and upset to have been sacked and could not believe such a flimsy excuse was given". It went on to say that Graham "believes ENIC always intended to sack him."

Since 2001
Graham has been out of management ever since, concentrating on his career as a football pundit for Sky Sports.

However, he was linked with several managerial vacancies after leaving Tottenham. In October 2001, following the dismissal of Peter Taylor at Leicester City, he was linked with that vacancy, but it was filled by Dave Bassett instead.

The following season, with Glenn Roeder under fire at the helm of a West Ham United side heading for Premier League relegation, Graham's name was mentioned as a possible replacement, but Roeder actually lasted until the opening weeks of the 2003–04 season and this time there was little mention of Graham's name in the hunt for a successor, which ended with the appointment of Alan Pardew. In the 2003 close season, the resignation of Graham Taylor at Aston Villa saw Graham's name mentioned by the media as a possible successor, but again nothing came of it, with this vacancy being filled by David O'Leary, who had played under Graham at Arsenal and worked as his assistant at Leeds. He and O'Leary had both been mentioned as candidates for the job at Sunderland twice during the 2002–03 season following the departure of Peter Reid in October and Howard Wilkinson in March.

Personal life
On 16 September 1967, Graham married model Marie Zia at Marylebone Register Office; his close friend Terry Venables acted as his best man and the two players took to the field the same afternoon for opposing teams in a North London derby – the groom's team won 4–0. The couple had two children, Daniel and Nicole, but the marriage ended in 1988 when Marie had a relationship with dry cleaning boss Roger Bliss.

Graham married divorcee Susan Schmidt on 13 December 1998 in a lavish wedding held in Marlow, Buckinghamshire and the two set up their marital home in Hampstead, London.

Graham revealed in 2009 that he suffers from arthritis. "I love my golf but because of my arthritis, I've not played much in the last two years, if any. When I was a player, when I had a lot of time on my hands, I got down to an eight handicap. But when I was manager, I went back to 12. I've just taken up tennis and have to say I'm not very good."

Career statistics

Club

Honours

Player
Chelsea
Football League Cup: 1964–65

Arsenal
Football League First Division: 1970–71
FA Cup: 1970–71
Inter-Cities Fairs Cup: 1969–70

Manager
Millwall
Football League Trophy: 1982–83
Football League Third Division promotion: 1984–85

Arsenal
Football League First Division: 1988–89, 1990–91
FA Cup: 1992–93
Football League Cup: 1986–87, 1992–93
FA Charity Shield: 1991 (shared)
Football League Centenary Trophy: 1988
European Cup Winners' Cup: 1993–94

Tottenham Hotspur
Football League Cup: 1998–99

Individual
Premier League Manager of the Month: November 1997

Inductions
Scottish Football Hall of Fame: 2015

See also
 List of English football championship winning managers

References

External links

Full Managerial Stats for Leeds United from WAFLL

1944 births
Living people
Scottish footballers
Scotland international footballers
English Football League players
North American Soccer League (1968–1984) players
Aston Villa F.C. players
Chelsea F.C. players
Arsenal F.C. players
Manchester United F.C. players
Portsmouth F.C. players
Crystal Palace F.C. players
California Surf players
Scottish football managers
Premier League managers
English Football League managers
Millwall F.C. managers
Arsenal F.C. managers
Leeds United F.C. managers
Tottenham Hotspur F.C. managers
Footballers from North Lanarkshire
Scotland under-23 international footballers
Scottish Football Hall of Fame inductees
Association football midfielders
Association football forwards
Scottish expatriate sportspeople in the United States
Expatriate soccer players in the United States
Scottish expatriate footballers
Association football coaches
FA Cup Final players